The 1999–2000 NBA season was the Bulls' 34th season in the National Basketball Association. The Bulls won the Draft Lottery, and selected Elton Brand out of Duke University with the first overall pick in the 1999 NBA draft, and also drafted Ron Artest out of St. John's University with the sixteenth pick. During the off-season, the team acquired Hersey Hawkins from the Seattle SuperSonics, and signed free agent Fred Hoiberg, and re-signed former Bulls guard B. J. Armstrong, and former Bulls center Will Perdue, who both won championships from the team's first three-peat in the early 1990s.

However, the Bulls' struggles continued as they lost 26 of their first 28 games, posting 10 and 11-game losing streaks respectively. Along the way, the team signed free agent Chris Carr, who was previously released by the Golden State Warriors, and also signed three-point specialist Matt Maloney. At midseason, Toni Kukoč was traded to the Philadelphia 76ers, as the team acquired John Starks from the Warriors in a three-team trade. However, after just four games with the Bulls, Starks was released to free agency. The Bulls finished last place in the Central Division with a 17–65 record.

Brand averaged 20.1 points, 10.0 rebounds and 1.6 blocks per game, and was named to the NBA All-Rookie First Team, and shared Rookie of the Year honors with Steve Francis of the Houston Rockets, and also won the MVP award in the Rookie-Sophomore Game during the All-Star Weekend. In addition, Artest averaged 12.0 points and 1.7 steals per game, and was named to the NBA All-Rookie Second Team, while Carr contributed 9.8 points per game off the bench, Hoiberg provided with 9.0 points and 1.3 steals per game, but only played just 31 games due to a knee injury, and Hawkins contributed 7.9 points per game. Randy Brown provided with 6.4 points and 3.4 assists per game, while Maloney contributed 6.4 points per game, and Dickey Simpkins averaged 4.2 points and 5.4 rebounds per game.

Following the season, Hawkins re-signed as a free agent with his former team, the Charlotte Hornets, while Brown signed with the Boston Celtics, Maloney signed with the Atlanta Hawks, and Carr, Armstrong, Simpkins and Perdue were all released to free agency.

Offseason

Draft

Roster

Roster Notes
 Point guard Khalid Reeves was waived on January 4.
 Shooting guard John Starks was waived on March 21.

Regular season

Season standings

Record vs. opponents

Player statistics

Regular season

Awards and records
Elton Brand, NBA Rookie of the Year Award (shared with Steve Francis)
Elton Brand, NBA All-Rookie Team 1st Team
Ron Artest, NBA All-Rookie Team 2nd Team

Transactions

Free agents

Player Transactions Citation:

References

External links

Chicago Bulls seasons
Chicago
Chicago
Chicago